Blue Sox may refer to a number of sports teams:

Active baseball teams

Butler BlueSox
Leicester Blue Sox
Sydney Blue Sox
Valley Blue Sox

Defunct baseball teams

Abilene Blue Sox
Bet Shemesh Blue Sox
Covington Blue Sox
Davenport Blue Sox
Denison Blue Sox
 Elkhart Blue Sox
Martinsburg Blue Sox
South Bend Blue Sox
Utica Blue Sox

Other sports
Halifax RLFC - a rugby league team that was briefly known as the Halifax Blue Sox.